Alfred Jaretzki may refer to:

 Alfred Jaretzki Jr. (1892–1976), American lawyer and an expert on investment companies
 Alfred Jaretzki III (1919–2014), American surgeon and medical professor